Shaniah Power (born 20 March 1997) is an Australian rugby league footballer who plays as a  for the New Zealand Warriors in the NRL Women's Premiership and the North Queensland Gold Stars in the QRL Women's Premiership.

Background
Power was born in Bowen, Queensland and began playing rugby league for the Proserpine Brahmans.

Playing career
In 2019, while playing in Townsville for the Western Lions, Power represented Queensland Country at the Women's National Championships.

2020
On 22 February, Power represented the Indigenous All Stars in their win over the Māori All Stars. In March, she joined the North Queensland Gold Stars for their first QRL Women's Premiership season but did not play a game before the season was cancelled. She later played for the Wests Panthers in the Holcim Cup.

In September, she joined the New Zealand Warriors NRL Women's Premiership team. In Round 1 of the 2020 NRLW season, she made her debut for the Warriors in their 28–14 loss to the Brisbane Broncos. In Round 3, she scored two tries in their win over the St George Illawarra Dragons.

On 13 November, she made her State of Origin debut for Queensland in their win over New South Wales.

2021
On 20 February, Power represented the Indigenous All Stars in their 24–0 loss to the Māori All Stars.

References

External links
New Zealand Warriors profile

1997 births
Living people
Australian female rugby league players
Indigenous Australian rugby league players
Rugby league second-rows
New Zealand Warriors (NRLW) players